The National Chamber of Italian Fashion (Italian: Camera Nazionale della Moda Italiana) is a non-profit organization, whose purpose is the promotion, coordination of the Italian fashion industry and the training of young Italian designers.

It was founded in 1958. It is based in Milan, Via Gerolamo Morone n. 6. It currently represents more than 200 companies operating in various sectors: clothing, accessories, leather goods, footwear, distribution.

Noted Italian fashion designer Loris Abate served as president of the group from 1985 to 1991.

The Honorary President is Giuseppe Modenesep

Structure
The governing bodies of the National Chamber of Italian Fashion are the Board of Directors and the Management Committee. The Board is composed of a number of members ranging from eleven to eighteen. It has the power to the ordinary and extraordinary management of the association. The Presidential Committee consists of the President and four Vice-Presidents of the Executive Council. It deals with the ordinary and in the urgent cases it could substitute the Executive Council.

Activities
One of the key activities that is organized by the chamber is the fashion event to promote the Italian fashion, among them is Milan Fashion Week, which was established in 1958 and became one of the world's big four fashion weeks alongside New York City, London and Paris.

See also
Arab Fashion Council
British Fashion Council
Council of Fashion Designers of America
Fédération française de la couture
Fort Fashion Council

References

Non-profit organisations based in Italy
Italian fashion
Fashion organizations